Gigantactis kreffti is a species of fish in the whipnose angler (Gigantactinidae) family, first described in 1981 by Erik Bertelsen, Theodore Wells Pietsch III and Robert J. Lavenberg. The species epithet, kreffti, honours the ichythyologist, Gerhard Krefft. 

The species has seven soft dorsal rays and six soft anal rays, and is found in the territorial waters of Australia, Japan, Saint Helena, Ascension and Tristan da Cunha, and South Africa, at depths of 500 to 2,000 m. In Australia, it is found in waters south of Tasmania. The  largest specimen measured had a standard length of 34.5 cm.

References

Further reading
Stewart, A.L. and Pietsch, T.W. 2015. Family Gigantactinidae. In: Roberts, C., Stewart, A.L. and Struthers, C.D. (eds), The Fishes of New Zealand, pp. 932-936. Te Papa Press.

Deep sea fish
Bioluminescent fish
Taxa named by Theodore Wells Pietsch III
Fish described in 1981
Gigantactinidae
Taxa named by Erik Bertelsen